The 1999 World Matchplay was a darts tournament held in the Empress Ballroom at the Winter Gardens, Blackpool between 25–31 July 1999. The tournament was won for the second year in a row by Rod Harrington, who defeated Peter Manley in the final. In the 30th leg of the final Manley missed a shot at bullseye which, had he hit it would have been the first televised PDC 9 dart finish.

This was the first time that the first round was best of 19 legs, instead of best of 15 legs used from the 1994 World Matchplay to the 1998 World Matchplay.

Prize money
The prize fund was £58,000.

Seeds

Results

References

World Matchplay (darts)
World Matchplay Darts